Eino Tamm (born 20 November 1951 in Häädemeeste Parish, Kilingi-Nõmme District) is an Estonian lawyer and former politician, a founding member of the Estonian Coalition Party. He was a member of VII Riigikogu and VIII Riigikogu.

Education 

In 1970, Eino Tamm graduated from Nõo Secondary School.

In 1975, he graduated from the University of Tartu with a law degree (cum laude).

In 1989, Tamm graduated from Estonian Business School.

Career 

Eino Tamm was a vice mayor of Tallinn from 1990 to 1993.

Tamm was a founding member of the Estonian Coalition Party, founded in 1991.

In 1993, Tamm became a member of the first post-Soviet era legislature of the Estonian Parliament – VII Riigikogu.
He was also elected to VIII Riigikogu in 1995.
Throughout his career as an MP (1993–1999), Eino Tamm was a member of the Foreign Affairs Committee. In VII Riigikogu, he served as Vice Chairman of the Foreign Affairs Committee. In VIII Riigikogu, he served as Chairman of the Foreign Affairs Committee.

Tamm worked actively towards the goal that Estonia would be admitted to NATO and was an ardent promoter of that cause in the Estonian media. Estonia was eventually admitted to NATO in 2004.

Articles in the media about NATO

Honours and awards 
1995 – Commander 1st Class of the Swedish Royal Order of the Polar Star

Personal life 

Eino Tamm has six children, six grandchildren, and one great-grandchild.

Tamm's parents were farmers (during the Soviet time, collective farm workers) Jaan Tamm (1918–1977) and Linda Tamm (b. Linda Mitt) (1924–2011).

Tamm's maternal grandfather, Jüri Mitt, was arrested and deported to Siberia by the Soviet regime. He was released in 1953, after which he returned to Estonia.

Tamm's parents had four sons, of whom he is the youngest.

In 1971, he married Helle Põld, a fellow law student at the University of Tartu. Helle Tamm did not complete her law studies and later, after graduating from Tallinn Pedagogical University, became a librarian. They have four children – two sons and two daughters –, as well as six grandchildren and one great-grandchild. They divorced in 1995.

In 1997, Tamm married piano teacher Sirje Subbe. Eino Tamm and Sirje Subbe-Tamm have a son and a daughter.

References

Living people
1951 births
Members of the Riigikogu, 1992–1995
Members of the Riigikogu, 1995–1999